Kratt is an Estonian magical creature.

Kratt may also refer to:
 Kratt (ballet), Estonian ballet by Eduard Tubin
 Kratt brothers, American presenters
 Kratt's Creatures, a television series
 Wild Kratts, a US-American cartoon show

Surname

Kratt is a surname of German origin.

 Chris Kratt (born 1969) American zoologist and nature show host and Martin Kratt's brother.
 Martin Kratt (born 1965) American zoologist and nature show host and Chris Kratt's brother.
 Mary Norton Kratt (born 1937) American author
 Ronan Kratt (born 2003), Canadian soccer player

German-language surnames
Germanic-language surnames
Surnames of German origin